The men's long jump event at the 1985 Summer Universiade was held at the Kobe Universiade Memorial Stadium in Kobe on 30 and 31 August 1985.<ref

Medalists

Results

Qualification

Final

References

Athletics at the 1985 Summer Universiade
1985